Stefano Donagrandi (born 1 September 1976) is an ice speed skater from Italy, who won the gold medal in the Team Pursuit at the 2006 Winter Olympics. He placed 22nd in the 1500 m event, 13th in the 10000 m event, and 16th in 5000 m.

References

External links
 

1976 births
Living people
Italian male speed skaters
Speed skaters at the 2002 Winter Olympics
Speed skaters at the 2006 Winter Olympics
Olympic gold medalists for Italy
Olympic medalists in speed skating
Medalists at the 2006 Winter Olympics
Speed skaters of Fiamme Oro
20th-century Italian people
21st-century Italian people